Marguerite Whitten (February 23, 1913 – December 25, 1990) was an American film actress appearing in 14 films between 1938 and 1943,  often with actor Mantan Moreland. She was also billed as Margaret Whitten.

Whitten was born on February 23, 1913, in Mississippi. She died on December 25, 1990, in Los Angeles County.

Filmography 
 Spirit of Youth (1938) as Eleanor Thomas
 Two-Gun Man from Harlem (1938) as Sally Thompson
 The Toy Wife (1938) (uncredited)
 Way Down South (1939) (uncredited)
 Bad Boy (1939) (uncredited)
 Mystery in Swing (1940)
 Cadet Girl (1941)
 Let's Go Collegiate (1941)
 Mr. Washington Goes to Town (1941)
 King of the Zombies (1941)
 Lady Luck (1942) (uncredited)
 Professor Creeps (1942) as Mrs. Green
 Sleepytime Gal (1942) (uncredited)
 After Midnight with Boston Blackie (1943) (uncredited)

References

External links 

 

1913 births
1990 deaths
American film actresses
Actresses from Mississippi
People from Greenville, Mississippi
20th-century American actresses